Porfirio Remigio (born 15 September 1939) is a former Mexican cyclist. He competed in the team time trial at the 1964 Summer Olympics.

References

1939 births
Living people
Mexican male cyclists
Olympic cyclists of Mexico
Cyclists at the 1964 Summer Olympics
Place of birth missing (living people)